The Solvay Conferences have been devoted to outstanding preeminent open problems in both physics and chemistry. They began with the historic invitation-only 1911 Solvay Conference on Physics, considered a turning point in the world of physics, and continue to the present day.

Following the initial success of 1911, they have since been organised by the International Solvay Institutes for Physics and Chemistry, founded by the Belgian industrialist Ernest Solvay in 1912 and 1913, and located in Brussels. The institutes coordinate conferences, workshops, seminars, and colloquia. Recent Solvay Conferences usually go through a three year cycle: the Solvay Conference on Physics, followed by a gap year, followed by the Solvay Conference on Chemistry.

Notable Solvay conferences

First conference 
Hendrik Lorentz was chairman of the first Solvay Conference on Physics, held in Brussels from 30 October to 3 November 1911. The subject was Radiation and the Quanta. This conference looked at the problems of having two approaches, namely classical physics and quantum theory. Albert Einstein was the second youngest physicist present (the youngest one was Lindemann). Other members of the Solvay Congress were experts including Marie Curie, Ernest Rutherford and Henri Poincaré (see image for attendee list).

Third conference 
The third Solvay Conference on Physics was held in April 1921, soon after World War I. Most German scientists were barred from attending. In protest at this action, Albert Einstein, although he had renounced German citizenship in 1901 and become a Swiss citizen, declined his invitation to attend the conference and publicly renounced any German citizenship again. Because anti-Semitism had been on the rise, Einstein accepted the invitation by Dr. Chaim Weizmann, the president of the World Zionist Organization, for a trip to the United States to raise money.

Fifth conference 
Perhaps the most famous conference was the fifth Solvay Conference on Physics, which was held from 24 to 29 October 1927; the subject was Electrons and Photons and the world's most notable physicists met to discuss the newly formulated quantum theory. The leading figures were Albert Einstein and Niels Bohr. Seventeen of the 29 attendees were or became Nobel Prize winners, including Marie Curie who, alone among them, had won Nobel Prizes in two separate scientific disciplines. Attendees Einstein, Bohr, Werner Heisenberg, Paul Dirac, and Erwin Schrödinger were listed among the top ten greatest physicists of all-time in a 1999 poll of leading physicists for Physics World magazine.

Solvay conferences on physics

Conferences on physics gallery

Solvay conferences on chemistry

Conferences on chemistry gallery

References

Further reading 

  Franklin Lambert & Frits Berends: Vous avez dit : sabbat de sorcières ? La singulière histoire des premiers Conseils Solvay, EDP Sciences – Collection : Sciences et Histoire – octobre 2019
  Frits Berends, Franklin Lambert: paperity.org "Einstein's witches' sabbath: the first Solvay council", Europhysics News, 42/5 pp 15–17, 2011

External links 

 International Solvay Institutes (official website)
 The Solvay Science Project(Exhibition and database)
 Previous Solvay Conferences on Physics
 Previous Solvay Conferences on Chemistry
 Proceedings 1911
 Proceedings 1913
 Proceedings 1933
 Overview of the transcript of the famous Fifth Conference  American Institute of Physics
 Bacciagaluppi G., Valentini A. (2009.) Quantum Theory at the Crossroads: Reconsidering the 1927 Solvay Conference, Cambridge University Press, Cambridge, UK

Chemistry conferences
Physics conferences
Recurring events established in 1911
1911 establishments in Belgium
Science events in Belgium